The 2014 Parramatta Eels Season was the 68th in the club's history. Coached by Brad Arthur and captained by Jarryd Hayne and Tim Mannah, they competed in the NRL's 2014 Telstra Premiership. The Parramatta club finished the regular season 10th out of 16 teams, failing to make the play-offs.

Summary
Parramatta were determined to continue their rebuilding process in the off season after receiving the wooden spoon two years running. The club achieved this by releasing 12 players and signing more in key areas to help them reach success in the 2014 season. Some notable players are:

 William Hopoate
 Corey Norman
 Lee Mossop
 Nathan Peats

Parramatta also recruited a new coach in Brad Arthur, formerly an assistant coach at the club, as Ricky Stuart reneged on the final two years of his contract. This was in order to return to his hometown of Canberra and coach the Raiders, the team he played for during his youth.

Parramatta started strongly in the 2014 season, defeating the New Zealand Warriors 36-16 at Pirtek Stadium in their opening round, a mirror of twelve months previous where they also defeated the Warriors 40-10.

The Eels missed out on the finals for a fifth consecutive year with a loss to the Canberra Raiders in round 26 of the season, had they have beaten Canberra, Parramatta would have made it into the top 8. The loss had added bitterness as Canberra were coached by former Parramatta coach Ricky Stuart.

Standings

National Rugby League

National Youth Competition

Fixtures

Auckland Nines

Pre-season

Home and away season

Representative call ups

Domestic

International

References

Parramatta Eels seasons
Parramatta Eels season